The yacare caiman (Caiman yacare), also known commonly as the jacare caiman, Spanish yacaré, Paraguayan caiman, piranha caiman, red caiman, southern spectacled caiman, jacaré in Portuguese, and îakaré in Old Tupi, is a species of caiman, a crocodilian in the family Alligatoridae. The species is endemic to Argentina, Bolivia, Brazil, and Paraguay. Typical habitats of this caiman include lakes, rivers, and wetlands. Its diet primarily consists of aquatic animals, such as snails, and occasionally land vertebrates. Mating occurs in the rainy season and eggs hatch in March, with young fending for themselves as soon as they hatch. The yacare caiman was hunted heavily for its skin to use for leather in the 1980s, which caused its population to decrease significantly. However, trading restrictions placed since have caused its population to increase. Its population in the Pantanal is about 10 million, and it is listed as least concern on the IUCN Red List.

Taxonomy
François Marie Daudin originally described the yacare caiman in 1802 as Crocodilus yacare. Its specific name, yacare, comes from the word jacaré, which means "alligator" in Old Tupi and then transliterated to Portuguese. As of 2010, the exact relationship between the yacare caiman and related species is unclear and complicated. There have been attempts to analyze this relationship, but these have not produced definite conclusions. It is sometimes considered a subspecies of the spectacled caiman (Caiman crocodilus), which would make its scientific name Caiman crocodilus yacare. These two species are the same morphologically, but are considered separate species due to their geographical differences.

Description
C. yacare is a medium-sized caiman, brown in color. National Geographic has described young individuals as "look(ing) like nothing more than tiny, windblown seeds floating amid the rushes at the edge of a lagoon in Brazil's remote interior." Based on a study of the growth of multiple specimens in the Pantanal from 1987 to 2013, both sexes are about  SVL at age five. By age 15, they have mostly finished growth, with females being about  SVL and males over  SVL. The study also showed that individuals have significant variation in their growth rates.

Dark marks are distributed across the body; most noticeably, its lower jaw is covered with three to five blotches. It has a smooth snout, which is medium in length and broad. It has lumps on its eyelids and a curved ridge between its eyes. It has osteoderms on its scales, a feature also present in the spectacled caiman. It has an average of 74 teeth, with 5 pre-maxillary, 14–15 maxillary, and 17–21 mandibular. Some of the teeth on its lower jaw can poke through holes in its upper jaw. This feature makes its teeth more prominent and has been compared to piranhas, which has established the common name "piranha caiman".

Ecology
The yacare caiman is ecologically similar to the spectacled caiman. It lives in semi-aquatic habitats, including lakes, rivers, and wetlands, but is able to adapt to a variety of habitats. Individuals sometimes move to different locations in groups if their habitat is disturbed. The species' diet consists of aquatic animals, such as snails and fish, and occasionally snakes. It has also been known to eat capybaras. When hunting for snails, this caiman looks within vegetation floating in water and uses its jaws to break the shells of the snails. In July 1986, the stomach of a specimen in Bolivia was observed to be full of mud, along with small parts of eggshells that likely belonged to a caiman. In general, crocodilians can eat the eggshells of their own young subsequent to the young hatching.

Breeding usually occurs in December–February, in the middle of the rainy season. Nests are constructed by the females, built in a mound shape using mud and rotting vegetation. The species can lay as many as 44 eggs, but it most commonly lays 22–35, with the exact number often depending on the habitat type. It often exhibits multiple paternity, more so than several other crocodilian species. Females usually protect nests during incubation, but do so less when the human hunting pressure is high, ultimately causing a lower hatching success rate. Eggs hatch in March. Young exhibit precociality, receiving very little help from their parents and having to care for themselves. They hide in grasses in the daytime, as herons and storks can eat young caimans. Females become sexually mature at age 10–15. Similar species of the yacare caiman live to about age 50, which has been used as an estimate for this caiman's lifespan, but its exact lifespan is unknown.

Distribution and conservation 

The range of the yacare caiman includes Argentina (north), Bolivia, Brazil (south), and Paraguay. It is one of three species of genus Caiman in South America, the others being the broad-snouted caiman (C. latirostris) and the spectacled caiman (C. crocodilus), with more easterly and northerly ranges, respectively. The yacare caiman is one of the most common species on its continent.

In the 1980s, the species was "heading for oblivion" due to frequently being hunted for its skin; hunters often went to water holes containing many yacare caimans and shot large numbers of them. They utilized the skin for leather and left the other parts of the carcasses at the water holes. Although the species is covered with bony osteoderms, which had previously made it uncommon to be hunted for leather, it has some less bony spots which can be used for leather. This practice caused the caiman's population to drop by the millions. In 1992, a ban was issued in Brazil that prohibited the trading of crocodilian skins. This resulted in a significant increase in its population, with about 10 million specimens living in the Pantanal alone as of 2013. Current threats of the yacare caiman include deforestation, tourism, construction of dams and seaports, and illegal hunting. The species reproduces quickly, which makes it less susceptible to hunting pressure.

The IUCN Red List designated the yacare caiman a species of least concern in 1996. It is listed as threatened by the United States Fish and Wildlife Service as of June 5, 2000, after having been listed as endangered since June 2, 1970. As of 2010, it is listed as an Appendix II species by the Convention on International Trade in Endangered Species of Wild Fauna and Flora.

References

Further reading
Daudin FM (1802). Histoire Naturelle, Générale et Particulière des Reptiles; Ouvrage faisant suite à l'Histoire Naturelle générale et particulière, composée par Leclerc de Buffon; et rédigée par C.S. Sonnini, membre de plusieurs sociétés savantes. Tome second. Paris: F. Dufart. 432 pp. (Crocodilus yacare, new species, p. 407). (in French and Latin).

External links

Reichert, Michelle N., et al. (2018). "The respiratory mechanics of the yacare caiman (Caiman yacare Daudine) " [sic]. Journal of Experimental Biology 2018: jeb.193037. .

Alligatoridae
Crocodilians of South America
Fauna of the Pantanal
Reptiles of Brazil
Reptiles of Bolivia
Reptiles of Argentina
Reptiles of Paraguay
Reptiles of Uruguay
Reptiles described in 1802
Taxa named by François Marie Daudin